Amor is a 1982 CBS album by Julio Iglesias. It charted in the UK at No. 14 in 1983.

Track listing
 "Amor" – Gabriel Ruiz, Norman Newell, Ricardo López 3:20
 So Close To Me  – Julio Iglesias, Norman Newell, Rafael Ferro 3:35
 Momentos  y – Julio Iglesias, Ramón Arcusa, Tony Renis 3:33
 La Paloma  – Traditional Julio Iglesias, Ramón Arcusa   4:54
 Las Cosas Que Tiene La Vida   Danny Daniel 3:30
 Nathalie  Julio Iglesias, Ramón Arcusa 3:57
 Quijote   – Gianni Belfiore, Julio Iglesias, Manuel De La Calva, Ramón Arcusa 4:01
 L'Amour Fragile   – Pierre Carrel, Ray Girado 3:24
 No Me Vuelvo A Enamorar   – Fernán Martínez, Julio Iglesias, Ramón Arcusa 3:48
 Con La Misma Piedra   – Massias (Ketepao)  3:58
 Esa Mujer   – Fernán Martínez, Julio Iglesias, Rafael Ferro, Ramón Arcusa 4:06
 Si El Amor Llama A Tu Puerta   – Ray Girado 3:36

Certifications

References

1982 albums
Julio Iglesias albums